Heart Beat is a 1980 American romantic drama film written and directed by John Byrum, based on the autobiography by Carolyn Cassady. The film is about seminal figures in the Beat Generation. The character of Ira, played by Ray Sharkey, is based on Allen Ginsberg. The film stars Nick Nolte, Sissy Spacek, and John Heard.

The movie received generally mixed reviews, although the soundtrack was met with critical acclaim.  According to Box Office Mojo, its worldwide gross receipts were $954,046, making the movie a box office disappointment.

Plot
The film explores the love triangle of real-life characters Neal Cassady, Jack Kerouac, and Carolyn Cassady in the late 1950s and the 1960s. It chronicles  Kerouac writing his seminal novel On the Road, and its effect on their lives.

Cast
 Nick Nolte as Neal Cassady
 Sissy Spacek as Carolyn Cassady
 John Heard as Jack Kerouac
 Ray Sharkey as Ira (based on Allen Ginsberg)
 Ann Dusenberry as Stevie
 Margaret Fairchild as Mrs. Kerouac
 John Larroquette as TV Talk Show Host
 David Lynch as Painter
 Tony Bill as Dick
 Don Brodie as Dispatcher

Production
It was one of the first movies from the newly formed Orion Productions.

Critical reception
Roger Ebert of The Chicago Sun-Times gave the film 2½ out of 4 stars and praised certain aspects of the film:

Musical score and soundtrack

The score was composed by Jack Nitzsche, and included the song "I Love Her, Too" co-written by Buffy Sainte-Marie and sung by Aaron Neville. The soundtrack prominently featured saxophonist Art Pepper and other West Coast jazz musicians, with the soundtrack album released on the Capitol label.

Track listing
All compositions by Jack Nitzsche except where noted.
 "On the Road" - 3:16
 "Carolyn's Theme" - 1:53
 "Adagio for Strings" - 1:58
 "Three Americans" - 1:19
 "Jack's Theme" - 1:39
 "The World Is Waiting for the Sunrise" (Ernest Seitz, Gene Lockhart) - 2:10
 "I Love Her Too" (Jack Nitzsche, Buffy Sainte-Marie, John Byrum) - 3:50
 "Carolyn" - 3:18
 "Jam" - 2:28
 "Neal's Theme" - 1:55
 "901" - 3:01
 "Heart Beat" - 1:42

Personnel
Art Pepper - alto saxophone solos (tracks 1, 4, 5 & 9-11)
Conte Candoli - trumpet
Bud Shank - alto saxophone, flute
Bob Cooper - tenor saxophone, oboe
Pete Jolly - piano
Max Bennett - bass
Shelly Manne - drums
Shorty Rogers - arranger
Bob Enevoldsen - trombone
Tommy Tedesco - guitar
Frank Capp - drums
Emil Richards - percussion
Aaron Neville - vocals (track 7)
Les Paul and Mary Ford - guitar and vocals (track 6)
Unidentified Orchestra conducted by Alan Broadbent

References

External links
 
 
 

1980 films
Films about the Beat Generation
American biographical drama films
Films scored by Jack Nitzsche
Films based on biographies
Films set in the 1950s
Films shot in San Francisco
Orion Pictures films
Warner Bros. films
1980 drama films
Biographical films about writers
Films directed by John Byrum
1980s American films